The Erfurt latrine disaster occurred on 26 July 1184, when Henry VI, King of Germany (later Holy Roman Emperor), held a Hoftag (informal assembly) in the Petersberg Citadel in Erfurt. On the morning of 26 July, the combined weight of the assembled nobles caused the wooden second story floor of the building to collapse and most of them fell through into the latrine cesspit below the ground floor, where about 60 of them drowned in liquid excrement. This event is called the Erfurter Latrinensturz in several German sources.

Background 
A feud between Landgrave Louis III of Thuringia and Archbishop Conrad of Mainz, which had existed since the defeat of Henry the Lion, intensified to the point that King Henry VI was forced to intervene while he was traveling through the region during a military campaign against Poland. Henry decided to call a diet in Erfurt, where he was staying, to mediate the situation between the two and invited a number of other figures to the negotiations.

Event 
All of the nobles across the Holy Roman Empire were invited to the meeting, and many arrived on 25 July to attend. Just as the assembly began, the wooden floor of the deanery, in which the nobles were sitting, broke under the stress, and people fell down through the first floor into the latrine in the cellar. King Henry was said to have survived only because he sat in an alcove with a stone floor and was later saved using ladders. He departed as soon as possible. Landgrave Louis III of Thuringia survived as well.

Of those who died, many drowned in human excrement or suffocated from the fumes emitted by the decomposing waste, while others were crushed by falling debris.

Original texts 
Cronica Reinhardsbrunnensis, MGH. SS XXX/1, p. 541-542. (in Latin)
Cronica S. Petri Erfordensis moderna, MGH. SS XXX/1, p. 374. (in original Latin)
Chronik von St. Peter zu Erfurt (In German translation)

References 

1184 in Europe
1180s in the Holy Roman Empire
12th-century disasters
Building collapses in Germany
History of Erfurt
Henry VI, Holy Roman Emperor